The following article is a summary of the 2020–21 football season in Belgium, which is the 118th season of competitive football in the country and will run from August 2020 until June 2021.

Men's football

League season

Promotion and relegation
The following teams had achieved promotion or suffered relegation going into the 2019–20 season.

Belgian First Division A

Regular season

Belgian First Division B

Amateur Leagues
All leagues from the third level and below, were cancelled in January 2021 with just a few matches played, as measures taken by the Belgian government against the spread of COVID-19 prohibited amateur football. The tables below represent the standings at the time the leagues were cancelled, however the season will be recorded as a "blank season", meaning all results are void and no teams will be promoted or relegated for sportive reasons. Clubs might however still be removed in case they do not fulfill the requirements for their level or want to restart at the bottom of the pyramid.

Belgian National Division 1

Belgian Division 2

Division VFV A

Division VFV B

Division ACFF

Belgian Division 3

Division VFV A

Division VFV B

Division ACFF A

Division ACFF B

Cup competitions

Transfers

UEFA competitions
Champions Club Brugge qualified directly for the group stage of the Champions League, while runners-up Gent started in the qualifying rounds. Cup winners Antwerp started in the group stage of the Europa League, while Charleroi and Standard Liège started in the UEFA Europa League qualifying rounds after respectively finishing third and fifth.

European qualification for 2021–22 summary

Managerial changes
This is a list of changes of managers within Belgian professional league football:

First Division A

First Division B

Notes

See also
 2020–21 Belgian First Division A
 2020–21 Belgian First Division B
 2020–21 Belgian National Division 1
 2020–21 Belgian Division 2
 2020–21 Belgian Division 3
 2020–21 Belgian Cup
 2020 Belgian Super Cup

References

 
Belgium
Belgium